The Château de Rognac is a castle converted to a château and mill in the commune of Bassillac, Dordogne, France.

The site is privately owned and is not open to the public. It has been listed since 1945 as a monument historique by the French Ministry of Culture.

For a brief period, around the mid-1980s, it was used as a hotel and restaurant. Plans were drawn up to convert the mill into more accommodation.

See also
 List of castles in France

References

External links
 

Castles in Nouvelle-Aquitaine
Châteaux in Dordogne
Monuments historiques of Dordogne